Kalle Sievänen (9 March 1911 – 1 December 1996) was a Finnish sports shooter. He competed at the 1956, 1960 and 1964 Summer Olympics.

References

External links
 

1911 births
1996 deaths
Finnish male sport shooters
Olympic shooters of Finland
Shooters at the 1956 Summer Olympics
Shooters at the 1960 Summer Olympics
Shooters at the 1964 Summer Olympics
People from Loppi
Sportspeople from Kanta-Häme